The Defence Services Secretary is a senior member of the Royal Household of the Sovereign of the United Kingdom.

Responsibilities
The Defence Services Secretary is the senior member of the Royal Household responsible for liaison between the Sovereign and the British Armed Forces. He is answerable to the Secretary of State for Defence and the Chief of Defence Staff for tri-service appointments, national ceremonial events and honours, decorations, awards and medals. From 1992 to 2022, the Defence Services Secretary was double-hatted with a second Ministry of Defence role, generally that of Assistant Chief of Defence Staff (Personnel).

List of Defence Services Secretaries
Defence Services Secretaries have been:
General Sir Rodney Moore,  1964–1966
Vice Admiral Sir Ian Hogg,  1966–1967
Air Vice-Marshal Sir Alan Boxer,  1967–1970
Major General Sir Chandos Blair,  1970–1972
Rear Admiral Sir Ronald Forrest,  1972–1975
Air Vice-Marshal Sir Brian Stanbridge,  1975–1979
Rear Admiral Sir Leslie Townsend,  1979–1982
Major General Sir Michael Palmer,  1982–1985
Air Vice-Marshal Sir Richard Peirse,  1985–1988
Rear Admiral Sir David Allen,  1988–1991
Major General Brian Pennicott,  1991–1994 (Assistant Chief of Defence Staff (Personnel and Reserves) from 1992)
Air Vice-Marshal Peter Harding,  1994–1998
Rear Admiral Rodney Lees,  1998–2001 (Assistant Chief of Defence Staff (Personnel and Reserves) as secondary post)
Major General Christopher Elliot,  2001–2004 (Director General, Reserve Forces and Cadets as secondary post)
Air Vice-Marshal David Pocock,  2004–2005 (Assistant Chief of Defence Staff (Personnel and Reserves) as secondary post)
Rear Admiral Peter Wilkinson,  2005–2007 (Assistant Chief of Defence Staff (Personnel and Reserves) as secondary post)
Major General Matthew Sykes,  2007–2010
Air Vice-Marshal the Honourable David Murray,  2010–2012
Rear Admiral Simon Williams,  2012–2015 (Assistant Chief of Defence Staff (Personnel and Reserves) as secondary post)
Major-General Richard Nugee,  2015–2016 (Assistant Chief of Defence Staff (Personnel and Reserves) as secondary post)
Air Vice-Marshal Garry Tunnicliffe,  2016–2019 (Assistant Chief of the Defence Staff (Personnel Capability) as secondary post)
Rear Admiral James Macleod,  2019-2022 (Assistant Chief of the Defence Staff (Personnel Capability) as secondary post)
Major General Eldon Millar,  2022–present

References

Positions within the British Royal Household
British military appointments